Edin Terzić (born 25 April 1969) is a Yugoslav alpine skier. He competed in two events at the 1992 Winter Olympics.

References

1969 births
Living people
Yugoslav male alpine skiers
Olympic alpine skiers of Yugoslavia
Alpine skiers at the 1992 Winter Olympics
Place of birth missing (living people)